Mosannona pacifica is a species of plant in the family Annonaceae. It is endemic to Ecuador. Its natural habitat is subtropical or tropical moist lowland forests. It is threatened by habitat loss.

References

Annonaceae
Endemic flora of Ecuador
Endangered plants
Taxonomy articles created by Polbot
Plants described in 1998